Cardiff is the capital and largest city of Wales. Many notable people were born in Cardiff or share a strong association with the city, ranging from historical figures such as Henry Morgan to more recent figures such as Roald Dahl, Ken Follett and Griff Rhys Jones. In particular, the city has been the birthplace of international sportsmen and women, including Olympic athletes such as Paulo Radmilovic, Tanni Grey-Thompson and Colin Jackson. Many professional and international footballers, such as Craig Bellamy, Gareth Bale, Ryan Giggs and Joe Ledley, and former managers of the Wales national football team Terry Yorath and John Toshack were born in Cardiff, as were a number of international rugby union and rugby league players including Frank Whitcombe, Billy Boston, Gareth Llewellyn and Colin Dixon.
 
Cardiff is also well known for its musicians such as Ivor Novello, after whom the Ivor Novello Awards are named. Shirley Bassey is familiar to many as the singer of three James Bond movie theme tunes, while Charlotte Church is famous as a crossover classical/pop singer, and Shakin' Stevens was one of the top selling male artists in the UK during the 1980s. A number of Cardiff-based bands, such as Catatonia and the Super Furry Animals, were popular during the 1990s.

Art and literature

Business and finance

Entertainment

Historical figures

Journalism

Military

Music

Performers

Bands

Politics and law

Religion

Science, technology and medicine

Sport

Association football

Athletics

Boxing

Cricket

Cycling

Rugby

Other sports

References

People
 
Cardiff
Cardiff
Cardiff